Gary Hughes is a Canadian former soccer player who played in the USISL Select League, and the Canadian Professional Soccer League.

Playing career 
Hughes played college soccer with Brown University, and was named the Ivy League Player of the Year in 1995. In 1996, he played professional in the USISL Select League with South Carolina Shamrocks. After a season abroad he signed with St. Catharines Wolves in the Canadian National Soccer League. In his debut season with St. Catharines he won the regular season championship, and the CNSL Championship. In the championship final match the club faced Toronto Supra, and won the series by a score of 4-3.

Hughes returned to St. Catharines in 2000, when the organization competed in the CNSL successor league the Canadian Professional Soccer League. During the 2001 season he was selected for the CPSL All-Star squad against Morocco U-23. For the remainder of the season he assisted the Wolves in capturing the CPSL Championship by defeating Toronto Supra by a score 1-0. The following season, he retired from professional soccer.

Honors

St. Catharines Roma Wolves
CNSL Championship (1): 1996
CPSL Championship (1): 2001

References 

Living people
Canadian soccer players
South Carolina Shamrocks players
St. Catharines Roma Wolves players
USISL Select League players
Canadian Soccer League (1998–present) players
Canadian National Soccer League players
Association football defenders
Year of birth missing (living people)